Ester Workel (born 18 March 1975 in Enschede) is a rowing cox from the Netherlands.

With the Dutch eights she qualified for the 2004 Summer Olympics in Athens and she led her team mates rowing to the bronze medal. They won another bronze medal at the 2005 World Championships in Gifu. In 2007, she returned to the eights in which the Dutch only became seventh at the World Championships. Earlier that year they won the Rowing World Cup in Amsterdam and they finished third in both Luzern and Linz.

She qualified for the 2008 Summer Olympics in Beijing with the Dutch eights forming a team with Femke Dekker, Annemiek de Haan, Roline Repelaer van Driel, Nienke Kingma, Sarah Siegelaar, Marlies Smulders, Helen Tanger and Annemarieke van Rumpt.

References

1975 births
Living people
Dutch female rowers
Rowers at the 2004 Summer Olympics
Rowers at the 2008 Summer Olympics
Olympic rowers of the Netherlands
Olympic bronze medalists for the Netherlands
Olympic silver medalists for the Netherlands
Sportspeople from Enschede
Olympic medalists in rowing
Medalists at the 2008 Summer Olympics
Medalists at the 2004 Summer Olympics
20th-century Dutch women
21st-century Dutch women